Coptotriche roseticola is a moth of the family Tischeriidae. It was described by Frey and Boll in 1873. It is found in Ohio.

The larvae feed on Rosa setigera. They mine the leaves of their host plant.

References

Moths described in 1873
Tischeriidae